The Dudley Herbarium was the herbarium or plant specimen collection of the Stanford University Natural History Museum and the former Division of Systematic Biology of the Department of Biology, at Stanford University in California.

History
The collection was started by botanist William Russell Dudley (1849−1911), the head of the Stanford Botany Department from 1892 to 1911. LeRoy Abrams became curator in 1920.

In the early 1960s, Stanford Provost Frederick E. Terman made a decision to terminate support for the Division of Systematic Biology. Subsequently, various subcollections were transferred to other institutions in 1968 (algae to the University of California, fungi to the U.S. National Fungus Collections and arctic bryophytes to the New York Botanical Garden)

The main vascular plant collection was eventually transferred (by long-term loan), along with Stanford's Natural History Museum fish collections, to the California Academy of Sciences in San Francisco. In 1976, the Dudley Herbarium had 850,000-specimens, which were merged with the 600,000 specimens of the California Academy Herbarium, on completion of what was at the time a state-of-the-art facility to house the collections and staff, funded mostly by a grant from the National Science Foundation.

See also

References

Herbaria in the United States
California Academy of Sciences
Stanford University
Natural history of California